Maria Spelterini (sometimes spelled Spelterina and occasionally referred to as Marie, July 7, 1853 – October 19, 1912) was an Italian tightrope walker who was the only woman to cross the Niagara gorge on a tightrope, which she did on July 8, 1876 as part of a celebration of the U.S. Centennial. She used two and a quarter inch (57 mm) wire and crossed just north of the lower suspension bridge. She crossed again on July 12, 1876, this time wearing peach baskets strapped to her feet. She crossed blindfolded on July 19, and on July 22 she crossed with her ankles and wrists manacled. On July 27, 1876, she made her last trip across the Niagara Gorge on a tightrope.

Spelterini began performing in Italy at the age of three with other family members in a circus act. She toured Europe, performing at Moscow (crossing the Moskva River), St. Petersburg (crossing the River Neva), Saint Aubin on the Island of Jersey (August, 1872), and Catalan (24 August 1873).  In a May 5, 1877 performance in Rosario, Argentina she survived a fall while riding a velocipede (bicycle) that malfunctioned on a wire. An article appeared in the French newspaper L'Univers illustré in October, 1873, showing her crossing the harbour at Saint Aubin, Jersey and her portrait.

Spelterini arrived in the New York in 1876 and began performing at the Jones Wood Coliseum. Spectators paid twenty-five cents to see her do tricks on the wire, including running backwards and sitting in a chair while wearing a flamboyant costume. She sought permission to tightrope between the towers of the Brooklyn Bridge, which was still under construction, but was refused. So, she performed at Niagara Falls instead. Thousands traveled there to see her performances and to give her presents. She returned to Europe and little is known of her later life.

Italian rock noir band Belladonna dedicated to Maria Spelterini their song Maria Spelterini in their 2016 album The Orchestral Album.

References

External links
 Images of Maria Spelterini tightrope walking over Niagara Falls Niagara Falls Public Library (Ont.)
 Niagara's first female rope walker dazzled thousands with her stunts
 Life of lady wire walker shrouded in mystery / Spelterini, Maria
 Spanish article on the Argentina performance
 Maria Spelterini first woman to cross the Niagara Falls
 Stunters and Daredevils
 A History of Stunting at Niagara

1853 births
1912 deaths
Italian stunt performers
Tightrope walkers
Women stunt performers
19th-century circus performers